Akín is a popular Nigerian given name or nickname, which means bravery, 
valour or warrior in the Yorùbá language.

Akin Adesokan, Nigerian writer
Akin Akingbala (born 1983), Nigerian professional basketball player
Akin Akinsehinde (born 1976), Nigerian footballer
Akin Alabi, Nigerian music video director
Akin Ayodele (born 1979), former American football player
Akin Birdal (born 1948), Turkish politician
Akin Düzakin (born 1961), Turkish-Norwegian illustrator and children's author
Akin Euba (born 1935), Nigerian composer, musicologist, and pianist
Akin Fakeye (born 1936), Nigerian craftsman
Akin Famewo (born 1998), English professional footballer
Akin Fayomi (born 1955), Nigerian diplomat
Akin Gazi (born 1981), British actor of Turkish Cypriot descent
Akin Lewis (born 1957), Nigerian actor, director, and producer
Akin Mabogunje, Nigerian geographer
Akin Odebunmi, Nigerian professor
Akin Babalola Kamar Odunsi, Nigerian businessman
Akin Ogunbiyi, Nigerian businessman and politician
Akin Ogungbe, Nigerian filmmaker and actor
Akin Omoboriowo (1932–2012), Nigerian lawyer and politician
Akin Omotoso (born 1974), Nigerian film director, writer, and actor
Akin Osuntokun, Nigerian political scientist